The sooty grunter (Hephaestus fuliginosus), also known by the name black bream, blubberlips, Northern grunter or purple grunter, is a species of freshwater ray-finned fish, a grunter from the family Terapontidae. It inhabits coastal and inland freshwater creeks and rivers of northern Australia.

Description
The sooty grunter is a relatively large species of grunter which is brownish-grey to sooty-black grunter with darker scale margins, although some specimens may show golden blotches on the sides. The juveniles possess dark blotches on the anal fin and the soft-rayed part of the dorsal fin. There is a discontinuous lip fold on the ventral side of the lower mandible. As they grow some individuals develop thick, fleshy lips. They have a moderately deep body which is oblong to oval in shape, laterally compressed and a dorsal profile which bulges between the nape and the start of the dorsal fin. It has an oblique mouth with the maxillary reaching the level of the front edge of the eye in young birds but as the fish grows the gap between the eye and the maxillary increases. The teeth are conical and a little recurved in shape and are arranged in bands, with those in the outer rows the largest. There are no teeth on the roof of the mouth. They have a continuous dorsal fin which contains 11-12 spines and 12-14 soft rays, the spiny part is arched with the fifth to seventh spines the longest, the rays are longer than the spines.. The anal fin contains 3 spines and 8-10 soft rays. The caudal fin is marginate.

Distribution
The sooty grunter is endemic to northern Australia from the upper Burdekin River in Queensland to the Daly River in the Northern Territory It has been reported from southern New Guinea. although this refers to an undescribed species but it is absent from the Cape York Peninsula. It has been widely translocated within Australia.

Habitat and biology
Sooty grunters inhabit large flowing freshwater streams, preferring rapidly flowing waters with a rocky bottom and sparse aquatic plant cover. The species can tolerate acidic conditions to a pH of 4.0 and temperatures between 12 and 34 °C. It is an omnivorous species which has been recorded feeding on frogs, insects, worms, crustaceans, algae, plant roots and palm berries. They spawn during the summer as the water levels rise as a result of the monsoon, they may spawn in groups. The males guard and fan the eggs after fertilisation.

Fisheries
Sooty grunters are a regarded as a good angling fish. In Queensland there is a bag limit of 10 specimens.

Species description and etymology
The sooty grunter was first formally described as Therapon fuliginosus in 1883 by the Scottish-Australian naturalist William John Macleay with the type locality given as the Upper Burdekin River in northern Queensland. The specific name fuliginosus, from the Latin word fuligo, "soot", refers to the sooty coloration of the species.

References

External links
 Sooty Grunters on youtube

Hephaestus (fish)
Fish described in 1883